The following is a list of Detroit Pistons broadcasters, past and present.

Radio
The Pistons current flagship radio station is WXYT-FM 97.1.  There are several affiliate stations throughout Michigan.

Television
The Pistons current exclusive local television rights holder is Bally Sports Detroit.

Current announcers and hosts

George Blaha: television play-by-play (BSD games), radio play-by-play when Pistons are on national television.
Mark Champion: radio play-by-play (BSD games). BSD play-by-play if no one else available.
Matt Dery: radio pre-game and post-game host (or BSD play-by-play when Blaha is doing Michigan State football games).
Greg Kelser: television commentator (BSD games).
Mateen Cleaves: Television Studio Analyst (BSD Games).
Rick Mahorn: radio commentator.
Grant Long: television analyst and sideline reporter (BSD games)
John Long: fill-in radio commentator.
John Mason: Little Caesars Arena (home games) public address announcer.
Chris Fillar: radio pre-game and post-game host.
Johnny Kane: television play-by-play and sideline reporter (BSD games).

Former
Former TV flagship stations include WKBD-TV (1972–2004) and WMYD (2004–2008, sharing rights with WDIV-TV).

The Pistons flagship radio station was WJR-AM from 1969 through 1982.WWJ in late 1980s, WDFN in early 2000s  WXYT-FM until the end of the 2013-14 season.

References

 
Detroit Pistons
Broadcasters
Fox Sports Networks
Bally Sports